Marucelli is a family name of Italian origin. It may refer to: 

 Francesco Marucelli,  Italian abbot, bibliographer and bibliophile
 Giovanni Stefano Marucelli, Italian painter and architect
 Germana Marucelli, Italian fashion designer

Italian-language surnames